Sézanne is a commune in the Marne department and Grand Est region in north-eastern France. Its inhabitants are called Sézannais.

Population

Notable people
Leonie Aviat, Saint
Floresca Guépin (1813-1889), feminist, teacher, school founder
Raymond Marcellin, Politician

See also
Communes of the Marne department

References

Communes of Marne (department)